Andrea Neuenhofen (née Rosenbaum; born 25 December 1969), better known by her stage name AnNa R., is a German singer and songwriter who provides the lead vocals for German pop group Gleis 8. She was previously the main vocalist of Rosenstolz, a German pop duo that was active between 1991 and 2012 and had chart hits in Germany, Austria and Switzerland.

Early life
AnNa R. was born Andrea Rosenbaum on 25 December 1969 in Berlin-Friedrichshain and grew up in the former East Germany. She sang in a choir during her youth. After she had finished her secondary education, she auditioned for a place at Musikschule Friedrichshain (Friedrichshain music school), but was not accepted. Consequently, she took up private singing lessons. She also trained as a laboratory assistant after finishing her secondary education, but soon changed career to become a sheet music salesperson.

Music career

1991–2012: Rosenstolz

Looking for a pianist to help her to realize her aim of becoming a bar singer, AnNa R. was introduced by a friend to Peter Plate, a keyboard player who had just moved to Berlin and needed a singer. Although they had different musical aspirations, with AnNa R. preferring to sing chanson and Plate wanting to make English-language pop music, the pair got together to write songs, performing them as pop duo Rosenstolz.

Although their early records were not commercially successful, AnNa R. and Plate achieved increasing success over Rosenstolz's two-decade history, eventually having charts hits not only in their native Germany but also in Austria and Switzerland. These included five No. 1 studio albums in Germany. During their Rosenstolz career, AnNa R. and Plate undertook various initiatives to raise money for AIDS charities, and both were awarded the Bundesverdienstkreuz (Order of Merit of the Federal Republic of Germany) in 2011 in recognition of their efforts.  In 2012, the duo decided to split up. AnNa R. stated that both she and Plate wanted to take a break from each other and try something new.

AnNa R. was the main vocalist of Rosenstolz and also contributed to writing the lyrics of the band's songs with Plate and Ulf Leo Sommer. Towards the end of Rosenstolz, AnNa R. felt that she was not contributing as much to songwriting as she had done earlier in the band's history.

2012–present: Gleis 8

In January 2012, AnNa R. started working with musicians Lorenz Allacher, Timo Dorsch and Manne Uhlig. The following year, they officially announced their formation as the band Gleis 8. Their debut album Bleibt das immer so, which was released in May 2013, reached No. 7 in the German albums chart. AnNa R. writes the band's songs in cooperation with her band colleagues. She has described the band as being democratic, with all the members being of equal standing.

Personal life
AnNa R. married Nilo Neuenhofen in 2002. Her activities in her spare time include cooking and boxing.

Discography

Studio albums (Rosenstolz)
 Soubrette werd' ich nie (1992)
 Nur einmal noch (1994)
 Mittwoch is' er fällig (1995)
 Objekt der Begierde (1996)
 Die Schlampen sind müde (1997)
 Zucker (1999)
 Kassengift (2000)
 Macht Liebe (2002)
 Herz (2004)
 Das große Leben (2006)
 Die Suche geht weiter (2008)
 Wir sind am Leben (2011)
Studio albums (Gleis 8)
 Bleibt das immer so (2013)
 Endlich (2016)

References

External links

  
  at Universal Music Group website 

1969 births
German women singer-songwriters
HIV/AIDS activists
Living people
Singers from Berlin
R., AnNa
Recipients of the Cross of the Order of Merit of the Federal Republic of Germany
20th-century German women singers
21st-century German women singers